"I Don't Remember Me (Before You)" is a song recorded by American country music duo Brothers Osborne. It is the second single from their second studio album Port Saint Joe. The duo's members, T.J. Osborne and John Osborne, wrote the song with Shane McAnally and Matt Dragstrem.

Content
Duo members T.J. Osborne and John Osborne wrote the song with Shane McAnally and Matt Dragstrem. As with the rest of the corresponding album, Jay Joyce was the producer of the track. Billy Dukes of Taste of Country describes the song as "slow vulnerable ballad finds the two burly brothers offering their hearts to a lover." He also thought that by being a ballad, the song put a greater focus on T.J. Osborne's lead vocals than the duo's previous works.

Music video
The song's music video debuted on February 14, 2019. Directed by Wes Edwards and Ryan Silver, it features a bull rider who is recovering from substance abuse.

Chart performance

Certifications

References

2018 singles
2018 songs
Brothers Osborne songs
Songs written by Matt Dragstrem
Songs written by Shane McAnally
Song recordings produced by Jay Joyce
EMI Records singles
Music videos directed by Wes Edwards